The 1978 Dartmouth Big Green football team was an American football team that represented Dartmouth College during the 1978 NCAA Division I-A football season. The Big Green won the Ivy League for their fifth conference title of the 1970s.

In its first season under head coach Joe Yukica, the team compiled a 6–3 record and outscored opponents 187 to 159. Eugene “Buddy” Teevens and Joseph Nastri were the team captains.

The Big Green's 6–1 conference was the best in the Ivy League standings. Dartmouth outscored Ivy opponents 170 to 104. 

Dartmouth played its home games at Memorial Field on the college campus in Hanover, New Hampshire.

Schedule

References

Dartmouth
Dartmouth Big Green football seasons
Ivy League football champion seasons
Dartmouth Big Green football